The Hon. Henry Aldworth Neville (25 October 1824 – 5 November 1854) was an English first-class cricketer and British Army officer.

The son of Richard Griffin, 3rd Baron Braybrooke, he was born in October 1824 at Waltham St Lawrence, Berkshire. He was educated at Eton College. After finishing his education at Eton, he proceeded to purchased the ranks of ensign and lieutenant in the Grenadier Guards in September 1842. Neville played first-class cricket for the Marylebone Cricket Club (MCC) in 1844, making a single appearance against Oxford University at Lord's. He batted twice in the match, being run out for 0 in the MCC first innings, while in their second innings he was dismissed for 5 runs by Gerald Yonge. He later purchased the rank of lieutenant and captain in October 1846. Neville served in the Crimean War, during which he was killed in action at the Battle of Inkerman on 5 November 1854. His elder brother, Richard, succeeded their father as the 4th Baron Braybrooke in 1858.

References

External links

1824 births
1854 deaths
Younger sons of barons
People from Waltham St Lawrence
People educated at Eton College
English cricketers
Marylebone Cricket Club cricketers
Grenadier Guards officers
British Army personnel of the Crimean War
British military personnel killed in the Crimean War